Marcel-Ioan Miron (born 6 April 1982) is a Romanian tennis player.

Miron has a career high ATP singles ranking of 697 achieved on 28 August 2006. He also has a career high ATP doubles ranking of 322 achieved on 23 June 2008.

Miron made his ATP main draw debut at the 2007 BCR Open Romania in the doubles draw partnering Adrian Gavrilă.

External links

1982 births
Living people
Romanian male tennis players
21st-century Romanian people